WPGMA (Weighted Pair Group Method with Arithmetic Mean) is a simple agglomerative (bottom-up) hierarchical clustering method, generally attributed to Sokal and Michener.

The WPGMA method is similar to its unweighted variant, the UPGMA method.

Algorithm 
The WPGMA algorithm constructs a rooted tree (dendrogram) that reflects the structure present in a pairwise distance matrix (or a similarity matrix).

The WPGMA algorithm produces rooted dendrograms and requires a constant-rate assumption: it produces an ultrametric tree in which the distances from the root to every branch tip are equal. This ultrametricity assumption is called the molecular clock when the tips involve DNA, RNA and protein data.

Working example 

This working example is based on a JC69 genetic distance matrix computed from the 5S ribosomal RNA sequence alignment of five bacteria: Bacillus subtilis, Bacillus stearothermophilus, Lactobacillus viridescens, Acholeplasma modicum, and Micrococcus luteus.

First step 

 First clustering
Let us assume that we have five elements  and the following matrix  of pairwise distances between them :

 First branch length estimation
This corresponds to the expectation of the ultrametricity hypothesis.

 First distance matrix update
Bold values in  correspond to the new distances, calculated by averaging distances between each element of the first cluster  and each of the remaining elements:

Second step 

 Second clustering
We now reiterate the three previous steps, starting from the new distance matrix  :

 Second branch length estimation

We deduce the missing branch length:
 (see the final dendrogram)

 Second distance matrix update

Similarly:

The averaging procedure therefore gives differential weight to the initial distances of matrix . This is the reason why the method is weighted, not with respect to the mathematical procedure but with respect to the initial distances.

Third step 

 Third clustering
We again reiterate the three previous steps, starting from the updated distance matrix .

 Third branch length estimation

 Third distance matrix update
There is a single entry to update:

Final step 

The final  matrix is:

We deduce the two remaining branch lengths:

The WPGMA dendrogram 

The dendrogram is now complete. It is ultrametric because all tips ( to ) are equidistant from  :

Comparison with other linkages 
Alternative linkage schemes include single linkage clustering, complete linkage clustering, and UPGMA average linkage clustering. Implementing a different linkage is simply a matter of using a different formula to calculate inter-cluster distances during the distance matrix update steps of the above algorithm. Complete linkage clustering avoids a drawback of the alternative single linkage clustering method - the so-called chaining phenomenon, where clusters formed via single linkage clustering may be forced together due to single elements being close to each other, even though many of the elements in each cluster may be very distant to each other. Complete linkage tends to find compact clusters of approximately equal diameters.

See also 
Neighbor-joining
Molecular clock
Cluster analysis
Single-linkage clustering
Complete-linkage clustering
Hierarchical clustering

References 

Bioinformatics algorithms
Computational phylogenetics
Cluster analysis algorithms